The 2003 MasterCard German Open was a women's tennis event that was played in Berlin, Germany from 5 May to 11 May 2003. It was one of two Tier I events that took place on red clay in the build-up to the second Grand Slam of the year, the French Open. Third-seeded Justine Henin-Hardenne won the singles title and earned $182,000 first-prize money.

Finals

Singles

 Justine Henin-Hardenne defeated  Kim Clijsters, 6–4, 4–6, 7–5

Doubles

 Virginia Ruano Pascual /  Paola Suárez defeated  Kim Clijsters /  Ai Sugiyama, 6–3, 4–6, 6–4

Prize money

External links
 ITF tournament edition details
 Tournament draws

Qatar Telecom German Open
Berlin
WTA German Open
May 2003 sports events in Europe